Wolf 1061d is an exoplanet orbiting the red dwarf star Wolf 1061 in the Ophiuchus constellation, about 13.8 light years from  Earth. It is the third and furthest planet in order from its host star in a triple planetary system, and has an orbital period of about 217 days.

Characteristics

Mass, Radius, and Temperature

Wolf 1061d is known as a Super-Earth, with a mass significantly greater than that of Earth, but less than the ice giants Uranus and Neptune. However, because it was found with the radial velocity method and does not transit, only the planet's minimum mass is known. Wolf 1061d is at least 7.70 , close to the upper limit of the Super-Earth range. If the planet is rocky, it would have to be around 1.7 . For a more likely mixed composition of both rock and volatiles, Wolf 1061d would be at least 2.2 .

This is too cold for liquid water and would mean that the planet is entirely coated in ice, depending on its true composition.

Orbit

The orbit of Wolf 1061d is one of the longest observed for a Super-Earth in orbit around a red dwarf, as well as very eccentric. The average distance between the planet and the star (the semi-major axis) is 0.470 AU, or 47% the distance between the Earth and the Sun. This is comparable to Mercury's semi-major axis of 0.387 AU. Unlike Mercury, Wolf 1061d takes 217.21 days to orbit its host star, compared to Mercury's orbital period of 88 days. It also has a much higher orbital eccentricity of 0.55, nearly twice as high as that of Mercury. Wolf 1061d swings from as close as 0.2115 AU to as far as 0.7285 AU during the course of its year.

Host Star

Wolf 1061d orbits the M3.5V red dwarf Wolf 1061, which is one of the nearest stars to Earth at a distance of just under 14 light years. It is 0.294 times the radius and about 0.307 times the mass of the Sun with a temperature of 3342 K and an unknown age. For comparison, the Sun has a temperature of 5778 K and an age of 4.5 billion years. Wolf 1061 is about 1% as luminous as the Sun.

Habitability
Although the low stellar flux, the presence of additional greenhouse gases like methane or even hydrogen gas might make Wolf 1061d marginally habitable, due to the high probability of Wolf 1061d being a mini-Neptune combined with questionable prospects of being habitable for Earth-like life in the conventional sense makes this exoplanet a poor candidate for being “potentially habitable”.

A re-analysis of the system in March 2017 showed that Wolf 1061d is likely non-habitable; it's too far from its star and more likely to be a Mini-Neptune, with a minimum mass almost 8 times that of Earth. Even at its closest approach, Wolf 1061d never enters the system's habitable zone.

See also
 List of exoplanets

References

External links
Simulated view of the Wolf 1061 system. Video created by the University of New South Wales

Wolf 1061
Exoplanets discovered in 2015
Super-Earths
Ophiuchus (constellation)
Exoplanets detected by radial velocity